|}

References

External links
Bancuro Church Ruins

Naujan, Oriental Mindoro